The RK 03 Berlin is a German rugby union club from Berlin, currently playing in the Rugby-Bundesliga.

The club was formed in 2003, when the rugby department of the Post SV Berlin left the club. Post SV Rugby itself had been formed in 1967 as BSG Post Berlin Rugby.

History

Post SV Rugby

PSV's rugby department had been formed in 1967 in what was then East Germany, under the name of BSG Post Berlin Rugby.

Post Rugby took part in the East German championship, the DDR Rugby-Oberliga. It celebrated its greatest success in this league in the last decade of its existence, finishing third from 1985 to 1988, followed by two runners-up finishes in 1989 and 1990. Throughout its history, the club also provided a number of East German rugby internationals.

In 2003, the clubs rugby department left Post SV to form its own club, the RK 03 Berlin.

RK 03

PSV had last been playing in the 2nd Rugby-Bundesliga North/East in 2002-03 and RK took its place there, winning the league in its first attempt. After a 28-23 victory over South/West champion BSC Offenbach, the team earned promotion to the Bundesliga.

A seventh place in the first division in 2004-05 proved not enough and RK was relegated immediately, having won only one out of its fourteen games and losing the relegation match to DSV 78/08 Ricklingen 12-14. The season after, in the 2nd Bundesliga, the club won the league once more but lost the championship final to SC 1880 Frankfurt. In the following promotion match with now Bundesliga side DSV 78/08 another loss meant another year in the second tier.

In 2006-07, RK only came second in the 2nd Bundesliga but the season after, 2007-08, it won its division once more and a 22-6 win over ASV Köln Rugby earned it a second Bundesliga promotion.

In 2008-09, the club was struggling against relegation, finishing in eight place, its rival for league survival being bottom of the table side DRC Hannover. DRC accepted direct relegation at the end of the season, making the relegation final unnecessary, meaning, RK 03 will be playing in the Bundesliga for another season.

On 19 January 2009, the club received the long-awaited approval from the city of Berlin to upgrade its facilities, allowing, among other things, the instalment of flood lights.

With the Australian Allan Nugent, RK 03 hired a new coach for the 2009-10 season, relieving player-coach and captain Christian Lill from some of his duties, as he is also in charge of the German under-18 team.

The 2011-12 season saw the club finish above local rival BRC for the first time, in 8th place and thereby condemning the other Berlin club to a relegation spot. RK 03 finished second in their group in the 2012-13 season and qualified for the north/east division of the championship round, where it came third. The club was knocked out in the quarter finals of the play-offs after a 10–36 loss to SC Neuenheim.

In 2013–14 the team qualified for the championship and the play-offs once more, defeating RK Heusenstamm 33–19 in the first round and losing to Heidelberger RK in the quarter finals. In the 2014–15 season the club finished second in the north-east championship group and was knocked out by RG Heidelberg in the quarter finals of the play-offs. In the 2015–16 season RK won the north/east division of the Bundesliga but lost to TV Pforzheim in the semi-finals of the play-offs.

Club honours

Men
 2nd Rugby-Bundesliga
 Champions: 2004, 2008
 Division champions: 2002, 2004, 2006, 2008
 East German rugby union championship
 Runners up: 1989, 1990
 East German rugby union cup
 Runners up: 1980, 1982, 1987, 1988

Recent seasons
Recent seasons of the club:

Men

Post SV

RK 03

 Until 2001, when the single-division Bundesliga was established, the season was divided in autumn and spring, a Vorrunde and Endrunde, whereby the top teams of the Rugby-Bundesliga would play out the championship while the bottom teams together with the autumn 2nd Bundesliga champion would play for Bundesliga qualification. The remainder of the 2nd Bundesliga teams would play a spring round to determine the relegated clubs. Where two placing's are shown, the first is autumn, the second spring. In 2012 the Bundesliga was expanded from ten to 24 teams and the 2nd Bundesliga from 20 to 24  with the leagues divided into four regional divisions.

Women

Rugby internationals
In Germany's 2006–08 European Nations Cup campaign, no player from the club was called up for the national team, while, in the 2008–10 campaign, Lukas Rosenthal, Benjamin Ulrich and Lukas Hinds-Johnson were new additions to the German team, selected from the RK 03 squad.

In the 2010–012 European Nations Cup campaign, Lukas Hinds-Johnson was again called up for Germany.

The club, under the name of BSG Post, also produced the following East German internationals:
 Harald Lorenz
 Burt Weiß
 Christian Demuth
 Willi Ebel
 Wolfgang Michaelis
 Peter Wieczorek
 Frank Bittermann
 Frank Drenkow
 Thomas Boeck
 Andreas Rakoczy
 Roland Stutz
 Oliver Woeller
 Gert Lieck
 Jörg Pachmann
 Thomas Führer

Coaches
Recent coaches of the club:

References

External links
  Official website
 RK 03 Berlin club info at totalrugby.de

German rugby union clubs
Rugby clubs established in 2003
Rugby union in Berlin
2003 establishments in Germany